Oshiwara River is a river in Mumbai, India. It begins in the Aarey Milk Colony, cuts through the Goregaon hills, across the Aarey Milk Colony before emptying into the Malad Creek. On the way it is joined by another creek near Swami Vivekanand Road, before picking up industrial effluents and sewage while crossing the Oshiwara industrial estates and slums of Andheri. Most of the call centres in Malad have been built on reclaimed ground at the mouth of the river.

Clean up
After the 2005 Maharashtra floods in Mumbai, efforts are on to widen and clean up the river. Some proposals include converting it into a waterway for barges, setting up small farms on its banks and introduce biogas plants to convert waste into energy and use its slurry for manure for agriculture purpose.

See also

List of rivers of India
Rivers of India
Seven Islands of Bombay

References 

A Tale of Two Rivers; Times of India (Mumbai); Vaishnavi C Sekhar/TNN, 2006-01-09. (pdf version)

External links 

Rivers of Mumbai